Albert John Thompson (1885 – 14 June 1956) was an English amateur footballer who played as an outside left in the Football League for Grimsby Town.

Personal life 
Thompson's younger brother Ralph also played for Grimsby Town and was killed on the first day on the Somme. His father John was a builder and chairman of Grimsby Town in 1905 and 1906. Thompson served in the Royal Navy during the First World War and later rose to become a director of the Ross Group. For approximately forty years after retiring from football, Thompson wrote football stories for the Grimsby News under a pen name.

References

1885 births
1956 deaths
People from Louth, Lincolnshire
English footballers
Grimsby Rovers F.C. players
Grimsby Town F.C. players
Grimsby St John's F.C. players
English Football League players
Association football outside forwards
Royal Navy personnel of World War I